Murtaza Hassan (c. 1955 – 11 April 2011), also known by his stage name Mastana, was a Pakistani comedian and actor. Murtaza worked in many stage shows throughout a career which spanned more than three decades.

Biography
He worked in numerous stage shows such as Aashiqon Gham Na Karo, Chan Makhna, Bara Maza Aaye Ga, Larri Adda, Kotha, Rabba Ishq Na Hoye, Kaun Jeeta Kaun Haara etc.
He appeared as "Uncle Q" in Drama Shabdaig.

Death
Murtaza Hassan died on 11 April 2011, at the Victoria Hospital in Bahawalpur. He was believed to be 57 years old. He had a son, Hafiz M Saad Hassan.

References

1950s births
2011 deaths
Pakistani male comedians
Pakistani male stage actors
Pakistani male television actors
Infectious disease deaths in Punjab, Pakistan
Deaths from cancer in Pakistan
Deaths from hepatitis
Deaths from liver cancer
People from Bahawalpur District
Punjabi people